is a Japanese singer. She is known in Japan for her wide repertoire of Finnish Lieder, and is among the first artists to introduce Finnish vocal Music to Japan. She also performs Russian romances, German Lieder, French and Italian art songs, operatic arias, as well as Japanese songs.

She studied at the Tokyo College of Music and its graduate school, and graduated the performer course as top of her class in 2002. She has won several prizes in national and international vocal contests. She continued vocal studies for several years in Finland with Jorma Hynninen. Yoko Maria performs mainly in Tokyo, where she gives monthly recitals at venues including the Suntory Hall, the Kioi Hall, and Tokyo Opera City. She gave her US debut concert to a full house at Carnegie Hall on December 15, 2010. She is a relative of Conductor Kent Nagano.
Apart from her classical repertoire of Lieder and operatic arias, Yoko Maria combines also film music and jazz in her own crossover style. She also writes her own lyrics for modern and crossover pieces. Her debut album "Ave Maria – Eternal Love" is a compilation of classical and crossover pieces, and she recently appeared on a house compilation of songs from Studio Ghibli. On May 21, 2018 Yoko Maria performed at Carnegie Hall with Dutch composer and pianist Gijs van Winkelhof.

World Tour
 Paris March 13, 2015
 Sydney January 3, 2015
 New York  May 21, 2018 
 New York June  23, 2022

References

Year of birth missing (living people)
Living people
21st-century Japanese women opera singers
Japanese operatic sopranos
Singers from Tokyo
Tokyo College of Music alumni